Jorma is a Finnish male given name. It was very popular in Finland in the 1940s and 1950s. It is a Finnish version of the name Jeremiah. The name day is June 26.

People with the name
 Jorma Etelälahti (born 1951), former Finnish Nordic combined skier
 Jorma Gallen-Kallela (1898–1939), Finnish artist
 Jorma Härkönen (born 1956), Finnish middle-distance runner
 Jorma Hynninen (born 1941), Finnish baritone
 Jorma Katrama (born 1936), top ranking soloist in Finland
 Jorma Kaukonen (born 1940), American blues, folk and rock guitarist
 Jorma Kinnunen (born 1941), Finnish athlete
 Jorma Kortelainen (born 1932), Finnish cross-country skier
 Jorma Ojaharju (born 1938), author
 Jorma Ollila (born 1950), chairman and former CEO of Nokia Corporation
 Jorma Panula (born 1930), Finnish conductor, composer, and teacher of conducting
 Jorma "Jope" Ruonansuu (1964–2020), singer, comedian, actor
 Jorma Räty, Finnish weightlifter
 Jorma Sarvanto (1912–1963), Finnish Air Force pilot
 Jorma Taccone (born 1977), American writer, actor and director
 Jorma Valkama (1928–1962), Finnish athlete.

Finnish masculine given names